The City Municipality of Celje  is one of twelve city municipalities in Slovenia. Its seat is the city of Celje, a regional center of Styria.

Settlements

In addition to the municipal seat of Celje, the municipality also includes the following settlements:

 Brezova
 Bukovžlak
 Dobrova
 Glinsko
 Gorica pri Šmartnem
 Jezerce pri Šmartnem
 Košnica pri Celju
 Lahovna
 Leskovec
 Lipovec pri Škofji Vasi
 Ljubečna
 Loče
 Lokrovec
 Lopata
 Medlog
 Osenca
 Otemna
 Pečovnik
 Pepelno
 Prekorje
 Rožni Vrh
 Runtole
 Rupe
 Šentjungert
 Škofja Vas
 Slance
 Slatina v Rožni Dolini
 Šmarjeta pri Celju
 Šmartno v Rožni Dolini
 Šmiklavž pri Škofji Vasi
 Teharje
 Tremerje
 Trnovlje pri Celju
 Vrhe
 Začret
 Zadobrova
 Žepina
 Zvodno

References

Other reading

External links

 City Municipality of Celje at Geopedia
 Celje municipal website 

 
Celje
1994 establishments in Slovenia